Pantydia klossi is a species of moth of the family Erebidae. It is found in Western New Guinea in Indonesia and in Papua New Guinea.

References

Moths described in 1915
Pantydia
Moths of Indonesia
Moths of New Guinea
Taxa named by Walter Rothschild